Villa Juárez may refer to:

Villa Juárez, San Luis Potosí
Villa Juárez, Sonora